Pingami is a 1994 Indian Malayalam-language action thriller film directed by Sathyan Anthikkad and written by Reghunath Paleri based on his own short story Kumarettan Parayaatha Kadha. It was produced by Mohanlal through the company Pranavam Arts, and stars himself along with Puneet Issar, Jagathy Sreekumar, Thilakan, Innocent, Kanaka, Sukumaran, Janardhanan and Oduvil Unnikrishnan in supporting roles. The film follows Captain Vijay, who forms a close bond with Kumaran, a severely injured man. However, when he dies, Vijay decides to investigate the cause of his death. 

The music was composed by Johnson. The film was released on 27 May 1994 and was an average success at the box office.

Plot
Captain Vijay Menon is an orphaned army officer, who returns on his annual leave to stay with his maternal aunt and uncle, who raised him and his younger sister after the untimely deaths of their parents and youngest sister. One day, Vijay sees a social worker named Kumaran lying on the road after an accident and moaning for help. He takes Kumaran to a hospital but is unable to save his life. Vijay finds out that Kumaran's accident was actually a pre-planned murder. With the help of his friend Kutti Hassan, he starts on a trail to find out the mystery behind the murder and in the midst, he finds out the missing links of his own life. 

It is revealed that Kumaran was murdered by the same people who had killed Vijay's father, an honest IFS officer who apprehended smuggling of timber. Vijay's father's murder was witnessed by Kumaran, who tried to find justice for Vijay's family. This revelation prompts Vijay to seek vengeance on his father's killers in his own ways while simultaneously falling in love with Kumaran's daughter Sridevi. Through Kumaran's diary and his own investigations, Vijay finds out that his mother and sister aren't dead, as Kumaran had rescued them and admitted his sister and mother in a charity home where he regularly visited them. Vijay is able to reunite with his family and successfully finishes Kumaran's and his mission for justice.

Cast

Mohanlal as Captain Vijay Menon, a military officer
Puneet Issar as Edwin Thomas / Achayan (voiceover by Prof. Aliyar)
Jagathy Sreekumar as Kutti Hassan
Innocent as Advocate Iyengar
Thilakan as Illipanath Narayanan Kumaran / Kumarettan
Kanaka as Sridevi, Kumaran's daughter
Sukumaran as George Mathews / George Achayan, an influential politician
Janardhanan as Retd SP Koshy Varghese
Devan as Vijay's father, a government officer 
Shanthi Krishna as Subhadra, Menon's younger sister and Vijay's mother
Seetha as Parvathi, Vijay's younger sister
Vinduja Menon as Ganga / Mary / Chinnumol, Vijay's youngest sister
Oduvil Unnikrishnan as Menon, Vijay's maternal uncle
Meena as Menon's wife and Vijay's aunt
Kuthiravattam Pappu as Achuthan
Sankaradi as Muthappan
Mala Aravindan as Velichappadu
Kunchan as Auto driver Khader Kutty
Paravoor Bharathan as Advocate
T. P. Madhavan as Newspaper editor
V. K. Sreeraman as Police officer
Poornam Viswanathan as Varma, Revenue Intelligence officer
Sadiq as Studio owner
Ottapalam Pappan
Santhakumari as Kumarettan's wife and Sridevi's mother
Meena Ganesh as Kuttyhasan's mother
Santha Devi as Mother Superior
Abu Salim as Muthu
Bindu Varappuzha as Rukhiya
Antony Perumbavoor as Car driver Devasikutty

Production
Pingami was based on Raghunath Paleri's short story Kumarettan Parayatha Katha. He also wrote the screenplay. Sathyan Anthikkad made a genre change with Pingami who was usually known for making comical family dramas.

Music

The film features songs composed by Johnson and written by Kaithapram.

Release
The film was released on 27 May 1994.

Reception

Box office 
It was an average success at the box office.

Critical response 
Upon release the film received mixed reviews. However, modern reception has been more positive.

References

External links

1994 films
1990s Malayalam-language films
Films directed by Sathyan Anthikad
Pranavam Arts International films
Indian action thriller films
Films shot in Kozhikode
Indian films about revenge
Films scored by Johnson